Alkalaj is a surname. Notable people with the surname include:

Olga Alkalaj (1907–1942), Yugoslav lawyer and activist
Sven Alkalaj (born 1948), Bosnian-Croatian diplomat